Boryszewo  (German Büssow) is a village in the administrative district of Gmina Darłowo, within Sławno County, West Pomeranian Voivodeship, in north-western Poland.

The village has a population of 184.

See also
History of Pomerania

References

Boryszewo